The Dona Francisca Hydroelectric Plant is a hydroelectric plant on the Jacuí River in the state of Rio Grande do Sul, Brazil, completed in 2001. It delivers 80 MW guaranteed power.

History

The Dona Francisca Dam impounds the upper Jacuí River, and is divided between the municipalities of Agudo and Nova Palma, Rio Grande do Sul.
The environmental study was undertaken by Engevix.
The installation license was granted by FEPAM/RS on 1 July 1998.
The initial concession of 35 years was granted on 28 August 1998.
Construction began in August 1998.
The operational license was granted on 30 November 2000.

The plant entered operation in 2001.
The second generation unit came into operation on 12 April 2001.
The plant was officially inaugurated  on 21 May 2001 in a ceremony attended by Vice President Marco Maciel and governor of Rio Grande do Sul, Olívio Dutra.
The State Electric Power Company (CEEE) and Dona Francisca Energética SA (Dfesa) received a 35-year concession to exploit the plant's power potential.

Technical

The powerhouse contains two Francis turbines.
Installed capacity is 125 MW, with 80 MW guaranteed.
Annual production is 679 GWh.

Financial

As of May 2001 investment was R$205 million.
The total cost was US$130 million.
The responsible companies were Gerdau (48%), Celesc (Santa Catarina Electric Power Plants: 20%), CEEE (10%) and Desenvix (2%).
From 23 August 2010 the concession was divided between CEEE (10%) and Dona Francisca Energética (90%).
Dona Francisca Energética is owned by Statkraft (2.12%), Copel (23.03%), Celesc (23.03%) and Gerdau (51.82%).

Impact

The reservoir floods parts of the municipalities of Agudo, Ibarama, Arroio do Tigre, Pinhal Grande, Nova Palma and Estrela Velha, all in Rio Grande do Sul.
It affected 518 rural properties, and 540 families with a total of 2,709 people were required to move.
The park was created in 2005 as environmental compensation for the hydroelectric plant.

Notes

Sources

Hydroelectric power stations in Brazil
Buildings and structures in Rio Grande do Sul
Dams completed in 2001
Energy infrastructure completed in 2001